Pryvitne is a village (a selo) in the Zaporizhzhia Raion (district) of Zaporizhzhia Oblast in southern Ukraine. Its population was 190 in the 2001 Ukrainian Census. Administratively, it belongs to the Avhustynivka Rural Council, a local government area.

The settlement was first founded in 1928 as Nova Oleksandrivka; in 1967, it was renamed to Pryvitne.

References

Populated places established in 1928
Populated places established in the Ukrainian Soviet Socialist Republic

Zaporizhzhia Raion
Villages in Zaporizhzhia Raion